Ian Sloan may refer to:

 Ian Sloan (field hockey) (born 1993), British hockey player
 Ian Sloan (mathematician) (born 1938), Australian applied mathematician
 Ian Sloan (politician) (born 1973), Australian politician